The  Jerusalem Fire was a wildfire that burned in Lake County, California, during the 2015 California wildfire season. The fire, which started on August 9, burned  before it was contained on August 25. As the fire progressed, inmate fire crews from Cal Fire played a vital role in fighting the fire with over 800 inmates on the line.

On August 12, Cal Fire officials confirmed that the fire had merged with the Rocky Fire which was burning to the north. Officials stated that with the northern edge of the Jerusalem Fire now touching the southern edge of areas already burned by the Rocky Fire the two incidents had merged.  They added that while the incidents would now both be operated under a unified command, they would retain their own names, acreage counts and containment dates.

By August 15, many of the evacuation orders had been lifted from the area but returning residents were warned to watch for down power lines that still could pose hazards.

References 

2015 California wildfires
Wildfires in Lake County, California
Wildfires in Napa County, California
August 2015 events in the United States